Jon Heyman (born February 7, 1961) is a baseball columnist for the New York Post, a baseball insider for MLB Network and WFAN Radio and co-host with Joel Sherman of the baseball podcast The Show.

Heyman has also appeared as a guest on numerous radio and TV programs, including Mike and the Mad Dog, The Michael Kay Show, Quite Frankly with Stephen A. Smith, Mike'd Up and Jim Rome is Burning.

Early years
Heyman was born in Santa Fe, New Mexico and grew up in Cedarhurst, New York. He is Jewish and had his bar mitzvah at Temple Sinai in Lawrence, New York in 1974. Heyman graduated from Lawrence High School in 1979. He went to Northwestern University's Medill School of Journalism and graduated in 1983.

Professional career
Heyman began his professional career as a sports writer with The Daily Dispatch in Moline, Illinois.

Heyman spent 16 years at Newsday, where he served as the New York Yankees beat writer, baseball columnist and general sports columnist. In 1999 and 2000, Heyman was a baseball columnist for The Sporting News.

Heyman joined Sports Illustrated in July 2006. At Sports Illustrated, Heyman generally reported on baseball news year-round and wrote a baseball notes column called The Daily Scoop for SI.com. The Daily Scoop ran most weekdays during the baseball season and twice a week during the offseason. 

In 2009, Heyman joined the newly launched MLB Network as a baseball insider. In the Sports Illustrated magazine, Heyman frequently wrote an "Inside Baseball" column. In December 2011, Heyman left Sports Illustrated to cover baseball for CBS Sports following the 2011 MLB Winter Meetings. In 2016, Heyman left CBS Sports and joined the FanRag Sports Network as an MLB insider and senior writer for Today's Knuckleball.

In April 2022, Heyman joined the New York Post as a baseball columnist. He and fellow New York Post baseball columnist Joel Sherman soon after launched a podcast named The Show. In December 2022, Heyman tweeted "Arson (sic) Judge appears headed to the Giants." Minutes later, Heyman deleted the tweet and issued a follow-up tweet reading: "Giants say they have not heard on Aaron Judge, [my] apologies for jumping the gun." Judge ended up resigning with the Yankees. A day later, Heyman was ridiculed for misspelling pitcher Cole Hamels' name in a tweet as "Coke Hamels."

References

External links
SI.com Jon Heyman Archive

1961 births
Living people
American male journalists
Major League Baseball broadcasters
Medill School of Journalism alumni
MLB Network personalities
Writers from Santa Fe, New Mexico
People from Cedarhurst, New York
Sportswriters from New York (state)